Rhode Island held its late election for the First Congress on August 31, 1790,  due to the late ratification of the Constitution, just about a month and a half before the October 18, 1790 election for the Second Congress.

See also 
 United States House of Representatives election in Rhode Island, October 1790
 United States House of Representatives elections, 1790 and 1791
 List of United States representatives from Rhode Island

Rhode Island 08
1790 08
United States House of Representatives 08